Kluane National Park and Reserve are two protected areas in the southwest corner of the territory of Yukon. The National Park Reserve was set aside in 1972 to become a national park, pending settlement of First Nations land claims. When agreement was reached with the Champagne and Aishihik First Nations over an eastern portion of the Reserve, that part—about —became a national park in 1993, and is a unit of the national park system administered co-operatively with Parks Canada. The larger western section remains a Reserve, awaiting a final land claim settlement with the Kluane First Nation. The park borders British Columbia to the south, while the Reserve borders both British Columbia to the south, and the United States (Alaska) to the south and west. 

The Reserve includes the highest mountain in Canada, Mount Logan of the Saint Elias Mountains. Mountains and glaciers, including Donjek Glacier, dominate the park's landscape, covering 83% of its area. The rest of the land in the park is forest and tundra—east of the largest mountains and glaciers—where the climate is colder and drier than in the western and southern parts of the park. Trees grow only at the park's lowest elevations. The primary tree species are white spruce, balsam poplar and trembling aspen.

Activities

A day-use area with boat launch, picnic facilities and campground is located at Kathleen Lake, and is operated from mid-May to mid-September. Hiking is a popular activity on trails such as St. Elias Lake, Mush Lake Road, Shorty Creek, Cottonwood, Rock Glacier, King's Throne, Kokanee, Auriol, Dezadeash River Trail, Alsek Trail, Sheep Creek Trail, Bullion Plateau Trail, Slims West or Soldiers Summit. Rafting on the Alsek River (a Canadian Heritage river), mountain biking on old mining roads, horseback riding through the Alsek Pass, boating on Kathleen Lake and Mush Lake as well as fishing for lake trout, Arctic grayling, rainbow trout, northern pike and sockeye salmon are also among activities available in the park.

The park was the subject of a short film in 2011's National Parks Project, directed by Louise Archambault and scored by Graham Van Pelt, Ian D'Sa and Mishka Stein.

In August 2013, Robert F. Kennedy, Jr. visited the park to see Mount Kennedy, named as a memorial to his uncle, U. S. president John F. Kennedy.

Fauna
Mammalian species that inhabit this park include Yukon wolf, bear, coyote, mink, lynx, river otter, caribou, Yukon moose, muskrat, snowshoe hare, marmot,  red fox, Dall sheep, beaver, wolverine, mountain goat, and arctic ground squirrel. This park contains about 120 species of birds, including the rock ptarmigan and the golden and bald eagles.

World Heritage Site
The bi-national Kluane-Wrangell-St. Elias-Glacier Bay-Tatshenshini-Alsek park system comprising Kluane, Wrangell-St Elias, Glacier Bay and Tatshenshini-Alsek parks, was declared a UNESCO World Heritage Site in 1979 for the spectacular glacier and icefield landscapes as well as for the importance of grizzly bears, caribou and Dall sheep habitat.

In a 2009 census of the Kluane herd, there were 181 northern mountain caribou, a distinct ecotype of caribou.

First Nations presence
Kluane National Park lies within the traditional territories of the Champagne and Aishihik First Nations and Kluane First Nation who have a long history of living in this region. Through their respective Final Agreements with the Canadian Government, they have made into law their rights to harvest in this region.

See also

National Parks of Canada
List of National Parks of Canada
List of Yukon parks
List of World Heritage Sites in the Americas

References

Further reading

External links

 Canada website for Kluane NP
 World Heritage site
 Kluane — a National Film Board of Canada documentary
 - Champagne and Aishihik First Nations
 - Kluane First Nation

 
Saint Elias Mountains
World Heritage Sites in Canada
World Heritage Sites in the United States
Parks in Yukon
Protected areas established in 1972
National parks in Yukon
1972 establishments in Yukon